Thor was a Danish research vessel from 1903 to 1927. She was built by Edwards Brothers at North Shields, England in 1899 as a steam trawler. Thor conducted hydrographical and oceanographical research in the North Atlantic and the Mediterranean and helped locate the spawning grounds of the Icelandic cod. Most importantly, Thor conducted two expeditions to the Mediterranean Sea in 1908-1910 with Johannes Schmidt as cruise leader. The aim of the expeditions, funded by the Carlsberg Foundation, was to locate the spawning grounds of the European eel. Contrary to their expectations the expeditions found that fewer eel larvae (leptocephals) were found the deeper they went into the Mediterranean, but they also grew larger. The logical conclusion was that the spawning grounds were not in the Mediterranean, but in the Atlantic Ocean. In a broader perspective, the greatest result of the two expeditions was the very large contribution to the general understanding of the oceanography and pelagic fauna of the Mediterranean.

In 1914, Thor was commissioned into to the Royal Danish Navy, in which she remained until decommissioned in 1920  and sold to Iceland.

Icelandic service

In 1920, Björgunarfélag Vestmannaeyja bought the ship and renamed it Þór. After paying for its operational cost for several years, the Icelandic government decided to buy the ship in 1926. With its purchase, the Icelandic Coast Guard was de facto established. In December 1929, Þór ran aground at Húnaflói during a storm and was wrecked.

References 

Research vessels of Denmark
Ships built on the River Tyne
1898 ships